Listed below are actors and personalities heard on vintage radio programs, plus writers and others associated with Radio's Golden Age.

A
Bud Abbott
Goodman Ace
Jane Ace
Roy Acuff
Franklin Pierce Adams
Mason Adams
Martin Agronsky
Ben Alexander
Joan Alexander
Barbara Jo Allen
Fred Allen
Gracie Allen
Ida Bailey Allen
Mel Allen
Peggy Allenby
Fran Allison
Elvia Allman
Don Ameche
Jim Ameche
Morey Amsterdam
Arthur Anderson
The Andrews Sisters
George Ansbro
Eve Arden
Robert Armbruster
Garner Ted Armstrong
Herbert W. Armstrong
Louis Armstrong
Cliff Arquette
Jon Arthur
Robert Arthur, Jr.
Eleanor Audley
Artie Auerbach
Gene Austin
Gene Autry
Lew Ayres
Hy Averback
George Axelrod
Paul Harvey Aurandt

B
Harry Babbitt
Jim Backus
Parley Baer
Bob Bailey
Jack Bailey
Eugenie Baird
Art Baker
Belle Baker
Kenny Baker
Lucille Ball
Edwin Balmer
Sam Balter
Tallulah Bankhead
Joan Banks
Howard Barlow
Donald Grey Barnhouse
The Barry Sisters
Ethel Barrymore
Lionel Barrymore
Harry Bartell
André Baruch
Charita Bauer
Erik Bauersfeld
Gordon Baxter
Morgan Beatty
Jackson Beck
Sandy Becker
Brace Beemer
Francis X. Bushman
Ed Begley
Shirley Bell
William J. Bell
Bea Benaderet
William Bendix
Jack Benny
Jack Berch
Gertrude Berg
Edgar Bergen
Milton Berle
Bunny Berigan
Sara Berner
Ben Bernie
Dick Bertel
Alfred Bester
Rolly Bester
Don Bestor
Dr. Frank Black
Joan Blaine
Mel Blanc
Ray Bloch
Martin Block
Ford Bond
Johnny Bond
Nelson S. Bond
Shirley Booth
Victor Borge
The Boswell Sisters
Anthony Boucher
Willis Bouchey
Major Edward Bowes
William Boyd
Ray Bradbury
Bertha Brainard
Eddie Bracken
Truman Bradley
Rod Brasfield
Tom Breneman
Fanny Brice
Norman Brokenshire
Cecil Brown
Himan Brown
John Brown (actor)
Vanessa Brown
Nigel Bruce
Arthur Q. Bryan
Lyman Bryson
Winston Burdett
Billie Burke
Smiley Burnette
Bob Burns
George Burns
Edgar White Burrill
Abe Burrows
Francis X. Bushman
Herb Butterfield
Daws Butler
Pat Buttram

C
Kay Campbell
Candy Candido
Judy Canova
Charlie Cantor
Eddie Cantor
Phillips Carlin
Kitty Carlisle
Hoagy Carmichael
Art Carney
Don Carney
Ken Carpenter
Jack Carson
Boake Carter
Thomas Cassidy
Carmen Cavallaro
John Chancellor
Ernest Chappell
Paddy Chayefsky
Adele Clark
Dane Clark
Lon Clark
Al "Jazzbo" Collins
Shirley Bell Cole
Charles Collingwood
Ray Collins
Ted Collins
Bud Collyer
Ronald Colman
Jerry Colonna
Pinto Colvig
Perry Como
Willis Conover
William Conrad
Hans Conried
John Conte
Spade Cooley
Wyllis Cooper
Ted Corday
Charles Correll
Bill Corum
Norman Corwin
Lou Costello
Staats Cotsworth
Joseph Cotten
Jim Cox
Bob Crane
Sally Creighton
Richard Crenna
Mary Jane Croft
Bing Crosby
Milton Cross
Frank Crumit
Xavier Cugat
Bill Cullen
Howard Culver
Adelaide Hawley Cumming

D
Dilip Kumar
John Daly
Cass Daley
Marcia Davenport
Elmer Davis
Joan Davis
Dennis Day
Doris Day
Rosemary DeCamp
Ted de Corsia
Don DeFore
John Dehner
Kenny Delmar
Richard Denning
George V. Denny, Jr.
Andy Devine
Lawrence Dobkin
Peter Donald
Jack Douglas
Paul Douglas
Morton Downey
Bill Downs
Hugh Downs
Jessica Dragonette
Margaret Draper
Alex Dreier
Leanna Field Driftmier
Elaine Dundy
Joseph Dunninger
John Dunning
Don Dunphy
Jimmy Durante

E
Robert Easton
Nelson Eddy
Cliff Edwards
Douglas Edwards
Ralph Edwards
Webley Edwards
George Fielding Eliot
Minetta Ellen
Win Elliot
Bob Elliott
Dave Elman
Hope Emerson
Skinnay Ennis
Theodore Epp
Dale Evans

F
Clifton Fadiman
Percy Faith
Jinx Falkenburg
Alice Faye
Verna Felton
Parker Fennelly
George Fenneman
Jimmy Fidler
Joan Field
Benny Fields
Ted Fio Rito
Eddie Firestone
Michael Fitzmaurice
Bernadine Flynn
Bess Flynn
The Fontane Sisters
June Foray
Mary Ford
Senator Edward Ford
Bill Forman
Templeton Fox
Fred Foy
Arlene Francis
Stan Freberg
David Freedman
Paul Frees
Jane Froman
Alice Frost
Charles E. Fuller
Allen Funt

G
Martin Gabel
Frank Gallop
Jan Garber
Betty Garde
Ed Gardner
Dave Garroway
Betty Lou Gerson
Georgia Gibbs
GI Jill
Dolores Gillen
Art Gillham
Art Gilmore
George Gobel
Arthur Godfrey
Norris Goff
Benny Goodman
Bill Goodwin
Gale Gordon
Freeman Gosden
Morton Gould
Sandra Gould
Ray Goulding
Martin Grams, Jr.
Johnny Grant
Ben Grauer
Barry Gray
Glen Gray
Johnny Green
Virginia Gregg
Oliver B. Greene
Sydney Greenstreet
Ferde Grofé
Edgar Guest
Tito Guizar

H
Jester Hairston
Jack Haley
Walter Hampden
Fred Haney
Ernie Hare
Richard Harkness
Jim Harmon
Tom Harmon
Arlene Harris
Marion Harris
Phil Harris
Joseph C. Harsch
Wilbur Hatch
Bob Hawk
Jim Hawthorne
Bill Hay
George D. Hay
Helen Hayes
John Michael Hayes
Peter Lind Hayes
Dick Haymes
Paul Hecht
Horace Heidt
Skitch Henderson
Ed Herlihy
Bernard Herrmann
Jean Hersholt
George Hicks
Hildegarde
Richard Himber
Don Hollenbeck
Sterling Holloway
Skip Homeier
Hoosier Hot Shots
Bob Hope
Edward Everett Horton
Richard C. Hottelet
Eddy Howard
Quincy Howe
Arthur Hughes
Wilbur Budd Hulick
Warren Hull
Benita Hume
Anne Hummert
Chet Huntley
Marlin Hurt
Ted Husing

I
Bill Idelson
The Ipana Troubadors
Jose Iturbi
Burl Ives

J
Maze Jackson
House Jameson 
Leon Janney
Gordon Jenkins
Georgie Jessel
Parks Johnson
Raymond Edward Johnson
Al Jolson
Billy Jones
Spike Jones
Jim Jordan
Marian Jordan
Victor Jory
Jay Jostyn

K
Ish Kabibble
Mickey Katz
Danny Kaye
Evelyn Kaye
Joseph Kearns
Jackie Kelk
Joe Kelly
Pert Kelton
Nick Kenny
Ted Key
William Bennett Kilpack
John Reed King
Ernest Kinoy
Walter Kinsella
Durwood Kirby
Dorothy Kirsten
Raymond Knight
Richard Kollmar
André Kostelanetz
Gene Krupa
Jack Kruschen
Eloise Kummer
Joel J. Kupperman
Kay Kyser

L
Arthur Lake
Dan Landt
Jack Landt
Karl Landt
Frances Langford
Chester Lauck
Joe Laurie, Jr.
Paul Lavalle
Peggy Lee
Pinky Lee
Richard LeGrand
Lew Lehr
Sheldon Leonard
Jack Lescoulie
Larry LeSueur
Oscar Levant
Cathy Lewis
Elliott Lewis
Forrest Lewis
Fulton Lewis
Monica Lewis
Robert Q. Lewis
Beatrice Lillie
Art Linkletter
James Lipton
Mary Livingstone
Guy Lombardo
Vincent Lopez
Phillips Lord
Frank Lovejoy
George Lowther
Barbara Luddy
Bela Lugosi
Jimmy Lydon
Abe Lyman

M
Franklyn MacCormack
Norman Macdonnell
Nila Mack
Ted Mack
Gisele MacKenzie
Gordon MacRae
Dick Manning
Knox Manning
Joseph Marais
Fletcher Markle
Herbert Marshall
Dick Martin
Groucho Marx
Chico Marx
Elsa Maxwell
Marilyn Maxwell
Mary Margaret McBride
Mercedes McCambridge
Clem McCarthy
John Edward McCarthy
Gordon McLendon
Smilin' Ed McConnell
John McCormack
Myron McCormick
Joel McCrea
Tex McCrary
Hattie McDaniel
Lou McGarity
J. Vernon McGee
John McIntire
Elizabeth McLeod
Graham McNamee
Howard McNear
Don McNeill
James Melton
Lou Merrill
The Merry Macs
Don Messick
Glenn Miller
Marvin Miller
Spike Milligan
Billy Mills
Jan Miner
Shirley Mitchell
The Modernaires
Gerald Mohr
Vaughn Monroe
Ralph Moody
Garry Moore
Sam Moore
Agnes Moorehead
Claudia Morgan
Frank Morgan
Henry Morgan
Bret Morrison
Carlton E. Morse
Jack Moyles
Merrill Mueller
Frank Munn

N
Conrad Nagel
J. Carrol Naish
Long John Nebel
Frank Nelson
Ozzie Nelson
Ricky Nelson
John Nesbitt
Allan Nevins
Earl Nightingale
Ken Niles
Wendell Niles
Ray Noble
Ken Nordine
Jack Norworth
Jay Novello
Louis Nye

O
Jack Oakie
Arch Oboler
Anita O'Day
Dan O'Herlihy
Walter O'Keefe
Nelson Olmsted
Johnny Olson
Santos Ortega
Gary Owens
Harry Owens

P
Harry Parke
Dorothy Parker
Jack Paar
Raymond Paige
William S. Paley
Korla Pandit
Don Pardo
Bert Parks
Les Paul
Edward Pawley
Virginia Payne
Al Pearce
Jack Pearl
Minnie Pearl
Drew Pearson
Harold Peary
Jan Peerce
Louis Pelletier
Vincent Pelletier
Joe Penner
Irna Phillips
The Pied Pipers
Minerva Pious
George Polk
Lily Pons
Cowan Powers and his Family Band
Roger Price
Louie Prima
Carl Princi
Florence Pritchett
George Putnam
Joe Pyne

R
Don Quinn
Michael Raffetto
Katharine Raht
Amanda Randolph
Lillian Randolph
Basil Rathbone
Herbert Rawlinson
Stratton Rawson
Alan Reed
Alice Reinheart
Ethel Remey
Harry Reasoner
Seymour Rexite
Quentin Reynolds
Paul Rhymer
Irene Rich
Tommy Riggs
Rin Tin Tin
Rosa Rio
Robert Ripley
Ken Roberts
William N. Robson
Roy Rogers
Will Rogers
B. A. Rolfe
Mickey Rooney
Luis van Rooten
David Rose
Norman Rose
David Ross
Earle Ross
Lanny Ross
Johnny Roventini
Cecil Roy, The Girl of a Thousand Voices
Benny Rubin
Melville Ruick
Babe Ruth
Alfred Ryder
Michael Rye

S
Julia Sanderson
David Sarnoff
Harry Secombe
Vivienne Segal
Peter Sellers
Rod Serling
Eric Sevareid
Dan Seymour
Dan Seymour 
Walter Scharf
Del Sharbutt
Artie Shaw
Irwin Shaw
L. R. Shelton, Sr.
Jean Shepherd
Ransom Sherman
Nathaniel Shilkret
William L. Shirer
Dinah Shore
Herb Shriner
Ginny Sims
Singin' Sam
Frank Sinatra
Jasdev Singh
Penny Singleton
Red Skelton
Menasha Skulnik
Walter Slezak
Everett Sloane
J. Scott Smart
Smilin' Jack Smith
Ethel Smith
Hal Smith
Howard Smith
Howard K. Smith
J. Harold Smith
Whispering Jack Smith
Kate Smith
J. Anthony Smythe
Sons of the Pioneers
Olan Soule
Ann Sothern
Sigmund Spaeth
Phil Spitalny
Lawrence E. Spivak
Hanley Stafford
Jo Stafford
Arnold Stang
The Real Don Steele
Leith Stevens
Jay Stewart
Paul Stewart
Ezra Stone
Hal Stone
Shelby Storck
Amzie Strickland
Fran Striker
Roba Stanley
Rex Stout
Ed Sullivan
Marion Sweet
Karl Swenson
Raymond Gram Swing

T
Maurice Tarplin
Frederick Chase Taylor
Deems Taylor
Irene Tedrow
Alec Templeton
 Studs Terkel 
Walter Tetley
Danny Thomas
John Charles Thomas
Lowell Thomas
Bill Thompson
Kay Thompson
Tedi Thurman
Lawrence Tibbett
Martha Tilton
John Todd
Mel Torme
Arturo Toscanini
Dallas Townsend
Arthur Tracy
George W. Trendle
John Scott Trotter
Bob Trout
Dink Trout
Orrin Tucker
Sophie Tucker
Lurene Tuttle

V
Rudy Vallée
Art Van Damme
Art Van Harvey
Jean Vander Pyl
Luis van Rooten
Evelyn Varden
Westbrook Van Voorhis
Benay Venuta
Herb Vigran
Vicki Vola
Donald Voorhees

W
Ernestine Wade
Bea Wain
John Wald
Janet Waldo
Ed Walker
Lucille Wall
Mike Wallace
Jimmy Wallington
Fred Waring
Gertrude Warner
Mark Warnow
Willard Waterman
Doodles Weaver
Pat Weaver
Jack Webb
Dwight Weist
Ted Weems
Orson Welles
Gayne Whitman
Paul Whiteman
Barbara Whiting
Dick Whittinghill
Mary Wickes
Richard Widmark
Harlow Wilcox
Dave Willock
Meredith Willson
Marie Wilson
Walter Winchell
Paula Winslowe
Miriam Wolfe
Barbara Jean Wong
Lesley Woods
Alexander Woollcott
Ben Wright
Ed Wynn

Y
Barton Yarborough
Alan Young
Carleton G. Young
Robert Young
Henny Youngman
Roland Young
Victor Young

Z
Harry von Zell
Lawson Zerbe
Florenz Ziegfeld
Frederick Ziv

See also
List of old-time radio programs
List of U.S. radio programs

External links
 Necrology of Old Radio Personalities
OTR Actors and Their Roles